Zhang Bing (Chinese: 张冰; born 6 January 1969) is a male Chinese sports shooter. He competed at the 1996 Atlanta Olympic Games, and won a bronze medal in men's double trap.

References

1969 births
Living people
Chinese male sport shooters
Trap and double trap shooters
Olympic medalists in shooting
Asian Games medalists in shooting
Sport shooters from Henan
Shooters at the 1988 Summer Olympics
Shooters at the 1992 Summer Olympics
Shooters at the 1996 Summer Olympics
Shooters at the 1990 Asian Games
Shooters at the 1994 Asian Games
Shooters at the 1998 Asian Games
Shooters at the 2006 Asian Games
Medalists at the 1996 Summer Olympics
Olympic bronze medalists for China
Olympic shooters of China
Asian Games gold medalists for China
Asian Games silver medalists for China
Asian Games bronze medalists for China
Medalists at the 1990 Asian Games
Medalists at the 1994 Asian Games
Medalists at the 1998 Asian Games
People from Zhengzhou